Lorne Whitney Craner (born 1959) was an American foreign policy expert, has served in key diplomatic and policymaking roles in three administrations and three times as President of major non-governmental organizations.

Life and career

Early life
Craner was born at Bitburg Air Force Base in Germany.  He attended University College School in London and graduated from Phillips Exeter Academy.  Craner received a BA from Reed College and an MA in National Security Studies from Georgetown University.  His father Robert received three Silver Stars as a US Air Force pilot and prisoner of war in Vietnam  and his mother Audrey was awarded graduate degrees from the Fletcher School and Georgetown University.

Career
In the 1980s Craner worked on foreign policy issues in the US House of Representatives for Congressman Jim Kolbe and in the Senate for Senator John McCain.  In 1989 he became a Deputy Assistant Secretary of State for Legislative Affairs and in 1992 a Director of Asian Affairs at the White House National Security Council in the George HW Bush administration.   From 1993-2001 he was Vice President, then President of the International Republican Institute (IRI) a democracy assistance NGO.  He returned to government as Assistant Secretary for Democracy, Human Rights and Labor under Secretary of State Colin Powell.  His work in the Middle East, Central Asia and China after the 9/11 attacks drew praise from President Bush  Amnesty International  and Human Rights Watch  and Craner received the State Department’s Distinguished Service Award from Secretary Powell.   Craner returned to the IRI as President from 2004-2014.   He served two terms on the Board of the Millennium Challenge Corporation  and consulted on US-European relations and on political risk in Asia and the Middle East, before serving as President of the American Councils for International Education from 2017 to 2019.

References

External links
IRI President Lorne Craner's account and page at "Comment is Free".

1959 births
Living people
American activists
International Republican Institute
Walsh School of Foreign Service alumni
Reed College alumni
Phillips Exeter Academy alumni